Christos Theofilou (January 2, 1894 – August 19, 1975), better known as "The Golden Greek" Jim Londos (Greek: Τζίμ Λόντος), was a Greek American professional wrestler. Londos was one of the most popular stars on the professional wrestling circuit in the 1930s and 1940s.

Career 
Jim Londos was born Christos Theofilou in 1894 in Koutsopodi, Argos, Greece as the youngest of thirteen children of Theophilos and Maria. Before arriving in the United States, in his native Greece young Londos was a shepherd. His father, Theophilos was an amateur wrestler of considerable reputation, and is credited with having instructed his young son in the sport.

At age thirteen he ran away from home and eventually emigrated to the United States. Working whenever he could, Theofilou took several odd jobs including cabin boy, construction jobs, and posing nude for figure drawing classes. Theofilou landed a job as a catcher in a carnival acrobatic act. It was during this period that he was exposed to professional wrestling and began training. It was in the carnivals where Londos learned catch wrestling. Londos studied several different wrestling styles extensively and also trained in jiu-jitsu, which he came in contact with living near the Chinatown of San Francisco as a teenager. Lou Thesz stated in his autobiography that Londos was a very capable shooter as well as a top attraction performer.

Londos' first matches, from 1912, were as "The Wrestling Plasterer" Christopher Theophelus, a gimmick that saw him coming to the ring in overalls. After a number of years, he dropped this in favour of wrestling under the name Jim Londos and being a no-nonsense professional wrestler.

Londos became the most popular wrestler in the 1930s and 1940s while continuing to attract large crowds until 1959, competing against several world champions including Ed "Strangler" Lewis, Dick Shikat, Ray Steele and Joe Stecher. Londos was notably scheduled to wrestle a young Lou Thesz in the mid-30s, however Thesz's coach George Tragos pulled him out of the match, fearing fear Londos would try to hurt the up-and-comer and turn the match into a legit contest. In 1933, Londos competed in a mixed style  exhibition contest against jiu-jitsu practitioner Oki Shikina. One of the notable stipulations was that Londos had to compete in a jiu-jitsu gi. The match ended a draw.

Just before his retirement he married American woman Arva C. Rochwite (1912–1998), who was born in Clayton, Missouri. At the time of their marriage, Rochwite was described in press reports as a "St. Louis Aviatrix." The couple had three daughters: Diana, Demetra, and Christina. The Londos family moved to Escondido, California, where they settled on a 10-acre site nestled in an avocado grove. There, Londos quietly managed his orchard and other investments; he devoted the rest of his public life to charity.

Londos was considered a national hero in Greece. When he traveled there, one of his matches drew a crowd estimated as nearly 100,000 fans.

Retirement 
Londos retired in 1953. He spent the rest of his life working for charitable organizations. His favorite charity was Greek war orphans of World War II. He was honored by both United States President Richard Nixon and King Paul of Greece for his philanthropic efforts.

Londos died of a heart attack August 19, 1975, and is buried at Oak Hill Memorial Park in Escondido, California.

Championships and accomplishments 
 California State Athletic Commission
 World Heavyweight Championship (Los Angeles version) (5 times)
Cauliflower Alley Club
Posthumous Award (2020)
George Tragos/Lou Thesz Professional Wrestling Hall of Fame
Class of 2015
International Professional Wrestling Hall of Fame
Class of 2022
 Maryland State Athletic Commission
 World Heavyweight Championship (Maryland version) (2 times)
 Minnesota State Athletic Commission
 World Heavyweight Championship (Minneapolis version) (2 times)
 National Wrestling Association
 NWA World Heavyweight Championship (1 time)
 New York State Athletic Commission
 NYSAC World Heavyweight Championship (1 time) – unified with NWA World Heavyweight Championship
 Professional Wrestling Hall of Fame and Museum
 Class of 2002 (Pioneer Era)
 Wrestling Observer Newsletter
 Wrestling Observer Newsletter Hall of Fame (Class of 1996)
WWE
WWE Hall of Fame (Class of 2018)
 Other championships
 World Heavyweight Wrestling Championship (original version) (1 time)

References

External links 

 
 
 Biography from the Online Wrestling Museum
 Biography from the San Diego Hall of Champions

1894 births
1975 deaths
People from Argos-Mykines
Greek emigrants to the United States
20th-century American male actors
American male professional wrestlers
Greek male professional wrestlers
Greek wrestlers
Professional Wrestling Hall of Fame and Museum
WWE Hall of Fame Legacy inductees
Burials at Oak Hill Memorial Park (Escondido)
20th-century professional wrestlers